Pan Song (born November 3, 1975 in Dandong, Liaoning) is a male Chinese judoka who competed in the 2000 Summer Olympics and in the 2004 Summer Olympics.

In 2000 he finished seventh in the heavyweight competition. Four years later he was eliminated in the second round of the 2004 heavyweight tournament.

References
 profile

1975 births
Living people
Judoka at the 2000 Summer Olympics
Judoka at the 2004 Summer Olympics
Judoka at the 2008 Summer Olympics
Olympic judoka of China
Sportspeople from Dandong
Asian Games medalists in judo
Judoka at the 1998 Asian Games
Judoka at the 2002 Asian Games
Chinese male judoka
Asian Games bronze medalists for China
Medalists at the 1998 Asian Games
21st-century Chinese people